The Chaves County Courthouse, located on the 400 block of Main Street in Roswell, New Mexico, is the center of government of Chaves County. The courthouse was built in 1911 after Roswell's citizens learned that New Mexico would become a state the next year. Isaac Hamilton Rapp, of the Colorado firm I.H. and W.M. Rapp, designed the courthouse in the "monumental civic" adaptation of the Beaux-Arts style. A cupola with green tiles tops the courthouse.

The courthouse was added to the National Register of Historic Places on February 15, 1989.

See also

National Register of Historic Places listings in Chaves County, New Mexico

References

External links

Courthouses on the National Register of Historic Places in New Mexico
1911 establishments in New Mexico Territory
Government buildings completed in 1911
Buildings and structures in Chaves County, New Mexico
County courthouses in New Mexico
Roswell, New Mexico
National Register of Historic Places in Chaves County, New Mexico